Judith Sarah Jäger Bellaiche (born 2 February 1971, Lile) is a Swiss lawyer, Green Liberal Party politician and a member of the National Council since 2019. She is the managing director of Swico trade association.

Education 
Bellaiche studied Law at the University of Basel and an Executive MBA in General Management at the University of St Gallen. She took a career in finance where she worked for several years before co-founding a business.

Political career 
Bellaiche began her political career in her local community as an elected councilor in Kilchberg, Zuric where she served for 8 years. She headed building construction, real estate and planning department. In 2011, she was elected to the Zurich Cantonal Council where she was a member of Intergroup Conference from 2015 to 2019 and a member of WAK Commission for Economy and Taxes. She was elected to the National Council in 2019.

References 

Living people
1971 births
21st-century Swiss politicians
University of St. Gallen alumni
21st-century Swiss women politicians
Members of the National Council (Switzerland)